Thomas Septimus Geldart (15 February 1905 – 1985) was an English footballer who played as a left-half or inside-left. He made two appearances in the Football League for Barrow.

References

1905 births
1985 deaths
Footballers from Barrow-in-Furness
English footballers
Association football wing halves
Association football inside forwards
Barrow A.F.C. players
Egremont F.C. players
Kendal Town F.C. players
English Football League players
Footballers from Cumbria